Stephanodiscaceae is a family of diatoms belonging to the order Stephanodiscales.

Genera:
 Brevisira Krammer   
 Concentrodiscus G.C.Khursevich, A.I.Moisseeva & G.A.Sukhova   
 Crateriportula Flower & Håkansson

References

Thalassiosirales
Diatom families